Alastair Patterson (born 14 December 1972) is a Democratic Unionist Party (DUP)  politician in Northern Ireland. He served as an Ulster Unionist Party (UUP) Member of the Northern Ireland Assembly (MLA) for Fermanagh and South Tyrone between January and May 2016, having replaced Neil Somerville following the latter's resignation due to ill health. Patterson lost his seat in the 2016 Assembly Election.

Political career

Patterson served on the Environment Committee, and was Ulster Unionist Party Spokesperson on the Environment. Patterson contested the 2016 Assembly Election alongside his running mate Rosemary Barton. Patterson polled 3,010 (6.4%) of first preference votes, and was eliminated on the fifth count, with his transfers electing Barton. Following his defeat, he went on to defect to the Democratic Unionist Party, saying he was "let down and disappointed" by UUP decisions both locally and nationally. In an email to Ulster Unionist members, Patterson revealed that the majority of his friends and families were DUP supporters and that he "at a time of weakness on my part give [sic] into the advice they have been giving me since the Election"

Personal life

Outside politics, Patterson spent over twenty years in the Construction Industry, most recently serving as a Senior Quantity Surveyor. Patterson is a keen Pipe Bandsman, a former Drum Major with Field Marshal Montgomery Pipe Band, a four times World Champion Drum Major and current Adjudicator. He is a member of the Orange Order. Patterson is a supporter of Liverpool F.C. and Ulster Rugby.

References

1972 births
Living people
Northern Ireland MLAs 2011–2016
Ulster Unionist Party MLAs
People from Castlederg
Politicians from County Tyrone